Emri Zaid (born 10 March 1993) is an Israeli footballer who plays as a defender. He currently plays for Hapoel Afula.

Emri Zaid is the great grandson of Alexander Zaïd.

References

Profile page in Maccabi Haifa website

1993 births
Israeli Jews
Living people
Israeli footballers
Maccabi Haifa F.C. players
Maccabi Ahi Nazareth F.C. players
Hapoel Afula F.C. players
Hapoel Beit She'an F.C. players
Hapoel Asi Gilboa F.C. players
Israeli Premier League players
Liga Leumit players
Israeli people of Russian-Jewish descent
People from Kiryat Tiv'on
Association football central defenders